Hadzihalilovic or Hadžihalilović is a Bosnian surname. Notable people with the surname include:

Bojan Hadzihalilovic (born 1964), Bosnian graphic designer
Lucile Hadžihalilović (born 1961), French film director

Bosnian surnames